Mueang Nakhon Pathom is the capital district (Amphoe Mueang) of Nakhon Pathom province, central Thailand.

History
The district was created in 1895 named Phra Pathom Chedi District, under control of Mueang Nakhon Chai Si, Monthon Nakhon Chai Si. In 1898 the government moved the capital city of the monthon and the province from Nakhon Chai Si to Phra Pathom Chedi District. King Vajiravudh (Rama VI) changed the district name to Mueang Nakhon Pathom in 1913.

Geography
Neighboring districts are (from the north clockwise): Kamphaeng Saen, Don Tum, Nakhon Chai Si, Sam Phran of Nakhon Pathom province; Bang Phae, Photharam and Ban Pong of Ratchaburi province.

Khlong Chedi Bucha is the important water resource of the district.

Administration
The district is divided into 25 subdistricts (tambons), which are further subdivided into 217 villages (mubans). The city (thesaban nakhon) of Nakhon Pathom covers tambon Phra Pathom Chedi and parts of tambons Bang Khaem, Bang Khaem, Sanam Chan, Bo Phlap, Nakhon Pathom, Nong Pak Long, Lam Phaya, and Huai Chorakhe. There are a further three townships (thesaban tambons): Phrong Maduea covers parts of tambons Phrong Maduea and Nong Din Daeng, Tham Sala covers parts of tambon Tham Sala, and Don Yai Hom covers parts of tambon Don Yai Hom.

External links
amphoe.com (Thai)

Mueang Nakhon Pathom